Lisa Jean Barlow (née Lee; born December 14, 1974) is an American businesswoman and television personality. She is best known as a cast member of the reality television series The Real Housewives of Salt Lake City.

Life and career
Barlow was born and raised in Upstate New York. Originally Jewish, she and her family converted to Mormonism in her youth. She attended Brigham Young University.

Barlow is the founder of LUXE Marketing and co-owner of Vida Tequila with her husband John. They also have two children together.

Vida Tequila 
Vida Tequila launched in 2007. The tequila itself is distilled and barrelled in Arandas, Jalisco, Mexico.

Filmography

References

External links
Lisa Barlow - BravoTV

1974 births
Living people
21st-century American women
American Latter Day Saints
People from Salt Lake City
The Real Housewives cast members
Brigham Young University alumni